John Shapleigh (died 1414), of Exeter, Devon, was an English politician.

Family
He was the father of the MP, John Shapleigh II.

Career
He was a Member (MP) of the Parliament of England for Exeter in 1410.

References

14th-century births
1414 deaths
English MPs 1410
Members of the Parliament of England (pre-1707) for Exeter